Cuisy is the name of two communes in France:

 Cuisy, in the Meuse département
 Cuisy, in the Seine-et-Marne département